Gaspar Rubio Meliá (14 December 1907 – 3 January 1983) was a Spanish football forward and coach.

Club career
Born in Serra, Valencia, Rubio amassed La Liga totals of 61 games and 37 goals over the course of five seasons, representing in the competition Real Madrid (1928–30), Valencia CF (1934–35), Real Murcia (1940–41) and Recreativo Granada (1942–43). With the first club, he netted 72 times in 75 competitive appearances. In 1930–31, he also played briefly in Cuba with Juventud Asturiana and in Mexico with Real Club España.

Nicknamed El rey del astrágalo (King of the astragalus) due to the many ailments he had in that foot bone, Rubio subsequently worked as a manager with several teams – including as player-coach – but never in the top flight. In 1957 he moved to Mexico where he would settle after his retirement from football, coaching Atlante F.C. and Deportivo Toluca FC.

International career
Rubio gained four caps for Spain in less than one year, scoring nine goals. Seven of those came in his first two appearances, with a hat-trick against Portugal (5–0) and four against France (8–1), thus becoming the first Spanish footballer to score two international hat-tricks. His record remained untouched for more than 60 years, until Emilio Butragueño netted his second international hat-trick on 19 December 1990 against Albania, and remained unbroken for more than 80 years, until both Fernando Torres and David Villa scored their third hat-trick for Spain on 20 June 2013 against Tahiti in a 10-0 win.

Rubio also played a major role in England's first ever loss outside the British Isles, netting twice in a 4–3 triumph in Madrid on 15 May 1929.

Death
Rubio died in Mexico City on 3 January 1983, at the age of 75.

References

External links

1907 births
1983 deaths
People from Camp de Túria
Sportspeople from the Province of Valencia
Spanish footballers
Footballers from the Valencian Community
Association football forwards
La Liga players
Segunda División players
Tercera División players
Levante UD footballers
Real Madrid CF players
Atlético Madrid footballers
Valencia CF players
Real Murcia players
Granada CF footballers
Real Balompédica Linense footballers
UD Melilla footballers
Real Club España footballers
Spain international footballers
Spanish expatriate footballers
Expatriate footballers in Cuba
Expatriate footballers in Mexico
Spanish football managers
Segunda División managers
Granada CF managers
Levante UD managers
UD Melilla managers
Hércules CF managers
CD Atlético Baleares managers
Orihuela Deportiva CF managers
UE Lleida managers
Atlante F.C. managers
Expatriate football managers in Mexico
Spanish expatriate sportspeople in Mexico
Spanish expatriate sportspeople in Cuba